Golodets is a gender-neutral Slavic surname. Notable people with the surname include:

Adamas Golodets (1933–2006), Soviet footballer and manager
Olga Golodets (born 1962), Russian politician and economist 

Russian-language surnames